is a Croatian festive pastry made particularly for Christmas. They resemble little doughnuts, the Italian zeppole, Venetian frìtole, and the Dutch Christmas snack oliebollen ('balls of oil'). However, they are usually flavored with rum and citrus zest, containing raisins, and are topped with powdered sugar. A variant of the dish, called , is prepared in Slovenia.

Gallery

See also
 List of doughnut varieties 
 Nun's puffs

External links

http://www.clevelandwomen.com/house/rec-cccroat.htm
http://www.theworldwidegourmet.com/countries/europe/croatia/fritters.htm 

Croatian pastries
Christmas food
Doughnuts